Douglas Nordquist (born December 20, 1958, in San Gabriel, California) is a retired male high jumper from the United States, who competed at the 1984 Summer Olympics where he ended up in fifth place with a jump of 2.29 metres, one place behind distant cousin Dwight Stones.  He was TAC high jump champion in 1986 and 1988, and placed second at the 1984 Olympic Trials behind Stones. He competed for Sonora High School, finishing a three-way tie for third place at the 1977 CIF California State Meet, Fullerton Community College,  Washington State University where he was coached by 1968 Olympian Rick Sloan and Tiger International.  He was a practitioner of Washington State's specialized weight training for high jumpers  He set his personal record of 2.36m while finishing second at the TAC National Championships at Cerritos College in Norwalk, California on June 15, 1990.  That jump currently ranks Nordquist tied as the 25th best performer in history. For his athletic achievements, Nordquist was inducted into the Washington State University Hall of Fame in 2015 and was an inaugural inductee to the Fullerton College Track and Field Wall of Fame in 2019.

Doug Nordquist was a highly decorated director for the California High School Entertainment Unit, winning first place awards with the band. Nordquist retired from teaching at the end of the 2019–2020 school year and was honored as the Whittier Teacher of the Year, an award previously given to his father in 1986.

His personal bests in the event are 2.36 metres outdoors (Norwalk 1990) and 2.31 metres indoors (Genk 1987).

1993 at age 34, Nordquist competed at the Masters level winning high jump.  Norquist competed at the 1993 Masters National Outdoor Championship, winning the M30 high jump.

International competitions

References

External links

Article from Sports Illustrated
Biography from The Goal.com

1958 births
Living people
American male high jumpers
Athletes (track and field) at the 1984 Summer Olympics
Olympic track and field athletes of the United States
People from San Gabriel, California
Washington State Cougars men's track and field athletes
Track and field athletes from California
Sportspeople from Los Angeles County, California
Goodwill Games medalists in athletics
Competitors at the 1986 Goodwill Games
Competitors at the 1990 Goodwill Games
American masters athletes